Abacetus mameti is a species of ground beetle in the subfamily Pterostichinae. It was described by Alluaud in 1933.

References

mameti
Beetles described in 1933